The 2022 Evolution Championship Series (commonly referred to as Evo 2022 or EVO 2022) was a fighting game event held in Las Vegas from August 5 to 7, 2022 as part of the long-running Evolution Championship Series. The event offered tournaments for various video games, including Street Fighter V, Tekken 7, and Dragon Ball FighterZ, as well as the newly released Melty Blood: Type Lumina, Granblue Fantasy Versus and  The King of Fighters XV. It also marks the first time that Skullgirls was a main event game 10 years after its release. This is the first tournament held in-person since 2019. This is the first tournament sponsored under the co-sponsors Sony Corporation and Pokimane-led RTS.

Venue
EVO 2022 was, once again, hosted at the Mandalay Bay resort. The Mandalay Bay Convention Center hosted the first two days of the event, while the Mandalay Bay Events Center hosted the final day for the fifth consecutive time.

Games
The lineup was announced in March 2022 to have 9 games. Returning from last year are Tekken 7 and Dragon Ball FighterZ. Street Fighter V and Mortal Kombat 11 returned as updates Street Fighter V: Championship Edition and Mortal Kombat 11 Ultimate respectively. New additions are Guilty Gear Strive, KOF XV (replacing KOF XIV), Granblue Fantasy Versus, Melty Blood: Type Lumina, and Skullgirls 2nd Encore. Super Smash Brothers Ultimate was confirmed not to return to the tournament before the official reveal, marking the first time a Smash game was not in the main lineup since EVO 2012.

Participants
7,445 participants were at Evo 2022.

Broadcast
As usual, the tournament was streamed on the streaming site Twitch, broadcast across multiple different streams.

Reveals
A surprise teaser for an undisclosed Tekken project was showcased during Tekken 7's tournament. It would later be formally announced as Tekken 8 during Sony's State of Play presentation on September 13, 2022.

Results

External links

References

2022 fighting game tournaments
2022 in sports in Nevada
Evolution Championship Series
Esports competitions in the United States